Sayantani DasGupta (Bengali : সায়ন্তনী দাশগুপ্ত, born 1970) is an American physician and author of Indian heritage.

Early life and education
DasGupta grew up in Ohio and New Jersey and completed her undergraduate studies at Brown University. She  obtained her M.D and MPH degrees from Johns Hopkins University.

Academia
Originally trained in pediatrics and public health, Sayantani now teaches in the Master's Program in Narrative medicine at Columbia University and the Graduate Program in Health Advocacy at Sarah Lawrence College. She is a nationally recognized speaker on issues of gender, race, storytelling, and medical education, and has been featured on the cover of Ms., in O, The Oprah Magazine, in documentary films and other media outlets. She is an associate editor of the journal Literature and Medicine.

Publications

Sayantani has been published widely in academic and literary outlets, and journals including JAMA, The Lancet, Ms., Literary Mama Magazine, and Hunger Mountain. She has written extensively with her activist mother, Shamita Das Dasgupta, on mother-daughter experiences. She is the co-author of a book on Bengali folktales, author of a memoir about her education at Johns Hopkins School of Medicine, and co-editor of an award winning collection of women's illness narratives. Her debut middle-grade novel, The Serpent's Secret (Kiranmala and the Kingdom Beyond #1)  published by Scholastic came out in February, 2018. Her second book, Game of Stars (Kiranmala and the Kingdom Beyond #2) published in February, 2019, entered the New York Times Bestseller list in its debut week.

Bibliography

References

Columbia University staff
Brown University alumni
Johns Hopkins University alumni
Living people
1970 births
American people of Bengali descent
American women writers of Indian descent
American women of Indian descent in health professions
Writers from Columbus, Ohio
American women novelists
Novelists from Ohio
American young adult novelists
Women writers of young adult literature
American women non-fiction writers
20th-century American non-fiction writers
20th-century American women writers
21st-century American novelists
21st-century American non-fiction writers
21st-century American women writers